The Samsung NX300 is a mirrorless interchangeable lens digital camera a part of Samsung NX series and a successor to Samsung NX210. It was announced in Jan 2013 along with 45mm f/1.8 2D/3D lens and is the first single-lens system capable of capturing 3D photos or Full HD movies (See Stereo camera#Use of one camera and one lens).

In 2013 NX300 was named the best advanced mirrorless camera by TIPA (Best CSC Advanced, 2013).

Features

20.3 megapixel APS-C CMOS image sensor
Hybrid Contrast-detection/Phase detection autofocus 
ISO 100-25600 (with Auto-ISO mode and minimum shutter speed setting)
3.31” tilting touch-sensitive AMOLED display
1080p 60 HD video recording with built-in mic (stereo)
Built-in WiFi and NFC connectivity

References

Live-preview digital cameras
NX 300
Cameras introduced in 2013